Malmö Borgarskola is a Swedish gymnasium (upper secondary school) located in Malmö, Sweden.

The school was founded in 1874 and has a long tradition as an educational institute. The school is renowned for its International Baccalaureate programme, which consistently produces high achieving students. In addition, the students and the faculty have also won several national and international prizes and awards.

The school also has strong ties abroad. It hosts official education advising centres for students who are interested in studying in the USA (EducationUSA) and in the UK (EducationUK). Jack Straw visited the school when he was the Foreign Secretary for the United Kingdom.

The school offers several programmes, including:

 Natural Sciences Programme
 International Natural Sciences Programme
 Business and Management Programme
 Social Science Programme 
 Hotel and Tourism
 Business and Administration
 International Baccalaureate Diploma Programme 
 International Baccalaureate Career-related Programme (in Hospitality Administration)

The school is also home to a wide variety of student associations. MBIF, Malmö Borgarskola Sports Association, is one of the oldest sports associations in Sweden. Other associations includes MBEF, Malmö Borgarskola Aesthetics Association, and MBMF, Malmö Borgarskola Mathematics Association. There is also some friendly rivalry going on between Malmö Borgarskola and the nearby Sankt Petri school.

Notable students 
 Valerie Aflalo, Miss Sweden, 2000
 Daniel Andersson, footballer
 Renate Cerljen, Miss Sweden 2009
 Anita Ekberg, (1931-2015), Hollywood actress
 Adrian Granat, heavyweightboxer
 Per Albin Hansson (1885-1946), Prime Minister of Sweden, 1936-1946
 Zlatan Ibrahimović, footballer currently playing in AC Milan
 Agon Mehmeti, footballer
 Dardan Rexhepi, footballer
 Jasmin Sudić, footballer
 Evert Taube (1890-1976), author and artist

References

External links 
 Malmö Borgarskola
 International Baccalaureate at Malmö Borgarskola

Gymnasiums (school) in Sweden
International Baccalaureate schools in Sweden
Educational institutions established in 1874
1874 establishments in Sweden